Acrothinium is a genus of leaf beetles in the subfamily Eumolpinae. It contains three species, which are distributed in East Asia.

Species
 Acrothinium cupricolle Jacoby, 1888 – China (Fujian, Jiangxi, Zhejiang)
 Acrothinium cyaneum Chen, 1940 – China (Hainan)
 Acrothinium gaschkevitchii (Motschulsky, 1861)
 Acrothinium gaschkevitchii gaschkevitchii (Motschulsky, 1861) – China (Fujian, Jiangxi, Zhejiang), Taiwan, Japan, South Korea
 Acrothinium gaschkevitchii matsuii Nakane, 1956 – Japan (Okinoerabu)
 Acrothinium gaschkevitchii okinawense Nakane, 1985 – Japan (Okinawa)
 Acrothinium gaschkevitchii shirakii Nakane, 1956 – Japan (Amami Ōshima, Okinawa)
 Acrothinium gaschkevitchii tokaraense Nakane, 1956 – Japan (Tokara Islands)

Synonyms:
 Acrothinium hirsutum Tan & Wang, 2005: moved to Heterotrichus
 Acrothinium piffli Mandl, 1965: synonym of Colasposoma ornatum Jacoby, 1881
 Acrothinium violaceum Jacoby, 1889: synonym of Heterotrichus balyi Chapuis, 1874

References

Eumolpinae
Chrysomelidae genera
Beetles of Asia
Taxa named by Thomas Ansell Marshall